Obaichthyidae is an extinct family of ginglymodian ray-finned fish that lived in what is now Africa and South America during the Cretaceous period (Aptian–Cenomanian ages). It was erected in 2010 by Lance Grande to include the genera Dentilepisosteus and Obaichthys. In 2012, it was defined as a stem-based taxon containing all taxa more closely related to Obaichthys than to the genera Lepisosteus, Pliodetes or Lepidotes. Obaichthyids were close relatives of the modern gars of the family Lepisosteidae, with the two groups making up the superfamily Lepisosteoidea.

References 

Lepisosteiformes
Prehistoric ray-finned fish families
Aptian first appearances
Cenomanian extinctions